Richard Elgin McGarvie,  (21 May 1926 – 24 May 2003) was a judge in the Supreme Court of Victoria from 1976 to 1992, and the 24th Governor of Victoria from 1992 to 1997.

Early life
McGarvie was born and brought up on his parents' dairy farm at Pomborneit East in Victoria. The Second World War ended before he saw active service. He served with the British Commonwealth Occupation Force in Japan and was discharged as an able seaman in 1946.

McGarvie joined the Australian Labor Party in 1949 and took a leading role in the dismissal of its Victorian socialist-left dominated Central Executive by bringing about federal intervention.

Legal career
McGarvie studied law at the University of Melbourne and graduated in 1950, winning the Supreme Court Prize for the top honours student of the year. Joining the Victorian Bar in 1952, he became Queen's Counsel, chair of the Victorian Bar Council (1973–1975), Treasurer of Law Council of Australia (1974–1976), and Chancellor of La Trobe University (1981–1992).

McGarvie was appointed to the Supreme Court of Victoria on 1 June 1976, resigning all political affiliations, and served as a judge until 22 April 1992. He was appointed Governor of Victoria from 1992 to 1997.

Constitutional influence
Author of the McGarvie Model, McGarvie was an appointed delegate to Constitutional Convention on an Australian republic in February 1998, and initiated the 2001 Corowa conference to find common ground among republicans after the referendum defeat in 1999. He took the unusual position of making contributions to republicanism, without directly supporting the broader republican movement. He promoted his own model and at the 1998 convention argued the provision for two-thirds parliamentary dismissal of a president was unworkable.

See also
 Judiciary of Australia
 List of Judges of the Supreme Court of Victoria
 Process model (Australia)
 Victorian Bar Association

References

External links
 Full Text of Democracy by R. E. McGarvie
 Supreme Court of Victoria Website

1926 births
2003 deaths
Australian republicans
Companions of the Order of Australia
Governors of Victoria (Australia)
Judges of the Supreme Court of Victoria
Melbourne Law School alumni
Australian King's Counsel
Chancellors of La Trobe University
Delegates to the Australian Constitutional Convention 1998
People from Colac, Victoria
Royal Australian Navy personnel of World War II
Military personnel from Victoria (Australia)